Dorothy Marie Miner (August 14, 1936 – October 21, 2008) was an American attorney. Miner was known for work as chief counsel for the New York City Landmarks Preservation Commission.

Career
Born in Manhattan, Miner earned a Bachelor of Arts in History from Smith College in 1958. Her honors thesis was on the Tudor period and was titled "The Demands of the Tudor Rebels." She then continued on to receive a Juris Doctor from Columbia Law School in 1961, and a Master of Science in Urban Planning from Columbia, as well, in 1972.

A year later, Miner was named as counsel to the New York City Landmarks Preservation Commission. Her work there helped to create a legal process for landmark designations in the city, as part of the National Historic Preservation Act of 1966. Miner played a major role in presenting the case in Penn Central Transportation Co. v. New York City of 1978, in which the Supreme Court of the United States upheld the ability of the city to restrict development of Grand Central Terminal based on its landmark designation. The Penn Central company had argued that the development restrictions were unconstitutional and in conflict in terms of the Fifth Amendment to the United States Constitution and eminent domain. Miner left the commission in 1994, after her resignation was requested by Jennifer Raab.

Upon leaving the Commission, Miner accepted teaching positions at Columbia and at the Pace University School of Law.

Personal life
Miner was born to Marie and Dwight C. Miner, the noted professor of history at Columbia University. Her aunt of the same name, Dorothy Miner, was an art historian and first Keeper of Manuscripts of the Walters Art Museum. The Miner side of the family was of both British and Irish descent.

On June 25, 1970, Miner married James Edward O'Driscoll. Their marriage lasted until his death in 1993. Miner died in 2008 from complications of lung disease.

See also
List of Americans of Irish descent
List of Columbia University people in politics, military and law
List of Smith College people

References

External links
New York Times obituary

1936 births
2008 deaths
People from Morningside Heights, Manhattan
American people of British descent
American people of Irish descent
Smith College alumni
Columbia Law School alumni
Columbia Graduate School of Architecture, Planning and Preservation alumni
New York City Landmarks Preservation Commission
Columbia University faculty
Pace University faculty
New York (state) lawyers
20th-century American lawyers
Respiratory disease deaths in New York (state)
Deaths from lung disease